Esraa Mohamed Ahmed Mohamed Khogali (born 26 April 1992) is a Sudanese rower. She earned an invitation to compete for Sudan at the 2020 Summer Olympics in Tokyo, Japan. She was one of the flagbearers for Sudan during the 2020 Summer Olympics Parade of Nations as part of the opening ceremony on 23 July 2021, along with swimmer Abobakr Abass. She competed in the women's single sculls event as a tripartite invitation, and was the first athlete to ever represent Sudan in rowing.

References

1992 births
Living people
People from Khartoum
Rowers at the 2020 Summer Olympics
Olympic rowers of Sudan
International University of Africa alumni
Sudanese female rowers